Mongala is one of the 21 new provinces of the Democratic Republic of the Congo created in the 2015 repartitioning. Mongala, Équateur, Nord-Ubangi, Sud-Ubangi, and Tshuapa provinces are the result of the dismemberment of the former Équateur province.  Mongala was formed from the Mongala District whose town of Lisala was elevated to capital city of the new province.

Location
Mongala is located at the northwest of the country on the Congo River, and borders the provinces of Tshopo, Bas-Uele, Nord-Ubangi, Sud-Ubangi, Équateur and Tshuapa.
It is divided into three territories:
 Bongandanga
 Bumba, major town and site of a former secessionist state (1963) in the province.
 Lisala

The province includes the village of Yambuku.

History

From 1963–1966, Mongala Province was known as Moyen-Congo. However, under Mobutu, the province was reintegrated into the former Équateur province where it was administered as Mongala District, until 2015.
Presidents (later governors) of the Moyen-Congo province were:
  6 April 1963 – June 1964  Laurent Eketebi
 (de facto from 15 September 1962)
  April 1963 – 30 July 1963    Denis Akundji
 (president of secessionist province of Bumba)
 23 June 1964 – 10 August 1965  Augustin Engwanda
 10 August 1965 – 25 April 1966  Denis Sakombi (born 1929, died 1985)

References

 
Provinces of the Democratic Republic of the Congo